The Andrei Sakharov Prize is a prize that is to be awarded every second year by the American Physical Society since 2006. The recipients are chosen for "outstanding leadership and/or achievements of scientists in upholding human rights". The prize is named after Andrei Sakharov (1921-1989), Soviet nuclear physicist, dissident and human rights activist; since 2007 it has been valued at $10,000.

Recipients 
 2006 Yuri Orlov (Cornell University)
 2008 Liangying Xu (Chinese Academy of Sciences)
 2010 Herman Winick (Stanford Linear Accelerator Center), Joseph Birman (City University of New York), and Morris (Moishe) Pripstein (National Science Foundation)
 2012 Mulugeta Bekele (University of Addis Ababa) and Richard Wilson (Harvard University)
 2014 Boris Altshuler (P.N. Lebedev Physical Institute) and Omid Kokabee (University of Texas at Austin)
 2016 Zafra M. Lerman (Malta Conferences Foundation)
 2018 Ravi Kuchimanchi (Association for India's Development) and Narges Mohammadi (Iran Engineering Inspection Corporation)
 2020 Ayşe Erzan (Istanbul Technical University) and Xiaoxing Xi (Temple University)

See also

 List of physics awards

References

External links 
 Andrei Sakharov Prize, American Physical Society

Awards of the American Physical Society
Science in society
Human rights awards
Awards established in 2006